I'm Thinking of Ending Things (stylized as i'm thinking of ending things) is a 2020 American surrealist psychological thriller film written and directed by Charlie Kaufman. It is an adaptation of the 2016 novel of the same name by Iain Reid. The plot follows a young woman (Jessie Buckley) who goes on a trip with her boyfriend (Jesse Plemons) to meet his parents (Toni Collette and David Thewlis); throughout the film, the main narrative is intercut with footage of a school janitor (Guy Boyd) going to work, with both stories intersecting by the third act.

I'm Thinking of Ending Things was released in select theaters on August 28, 2020, and on Netflix on September 4, 2020. It received highly positive reviews from critics, who praised the two lead performances and the cinematography.

Plot
A young woman contemplates ending her approximately seven-week relationship with her boyfriend Jake while on a trip to meet his parents at their farm. During the drive, Jake attempts to recite a poem he read when he was younger, "Ode: Intimations of Immortality", and asks the young woman to recite an original poem of hers to pass time. After she recites a morbid poem about coming home, they arrive at the farmhouse owned by Jake's parents. Jake takes her to the barn, where he recounts a story about how the farm's pigs died after being eaten alive by maggots. Throughout the film, the main narrative is intercut with footage of an elderly janitor working at a high school, including scenes in which he sees students rehearsing Oklahoma! and watches a romantic comedy film.

Upon entering the farmhouse, the young woman notices scratches on the door leading to the basement. At dinner with Jake's parents, she (whose occupation and name change throughout) shows them photographs of her landscape paintings and explains how she met Jake at a trivia night in a bar, with narrative inconsistencies. Later, she notices a picture of Jake as a child, but becomes confused after initially recognizing the child as herself. She receives a call from a friend with a female name, and a mysterious male voice explains that there is "one question to answer". Over the course of the night, Jake's parents transform into their younger and older selves, though nobody on screen comments on this. When the young woman takes a nightgown down to the basement to wash, she discovers several janitor uniforms in the washing machine and finds posters for Ralph Albert Blakelock exhibitions that have images of paintings seemingly identical to her own. She also receives another call from the same mysterious voice.

On the drive home, Jake refers to several events that evening which the young woman does not remember and then claims she drank a lot of wine. Word association leads to an extended critical discussion of John Cassavetes' A Woman Under the Influence. Even though snow is falling, the couple stops at Tulsey Town, a drive-through ice cream stand, whose employees are students at the janitor's school. When the young woman is leaving, an employee with a rash says they are scared for her.

Jake and the young woman cannot finish their sugary desserts, so he stops at his high school to throw the ice-cream cups away. After a heated argument in the parking lot about the lyrics of "Baby, It's Cold Outside", they share a kiss. Suddenly, Jake has a flashback of the janitor watching them from inside the school and decides to confront him, leaving the young woman alone in the car. Eventually, she decides to look for Jake inside the school. She meets the janitor and asks him where Jake is, but she cannot remember what Jake looks like. She tells the janitor that nothing happened between Jake and her on the night they met, instead claiming Jake made her uncomfortable by staring at her.

The young woman discovers Jake at the end of a hall. They watch as people dressed like themselves and the janitor engage in a ballet, which ends when the janitor's dancer kills Jake's dancer with a knife.

Having finished his shift, the janitor enters his car, but does not start the motor. He experiences hallucinations of Jake's parents arguing and animated Tulsey Town commercials. The janitor then takes off his clothes and walks back inside the school, led by the hallucination of a maggot-infested pig who tells him that "someone has to be the pig infested with maggots", that "everything is the same, when you look close enough", and that he should get dressed.

On an auditorium stage, an old Jake receives a Nobel Prize and sings "Lonely Room" from Oklahoma! to an audience of people from his life, all of them in theatrical old-age makeup, who give him a standing ovation when he is done.

In the final shot, the couple's car is not visible in the school parking lot, while the janitor's truck is covered in snow. Towards the end of the credits, scraping sounds and the engine of an approaching vehicle are heard.

Cast

Production
It was announced in January 2018 that Charlie Kaufman was adapting Iain Reid's novel I'm Thinking of Ending Things for Netflix, as well as directing. In December, Brie Larson and Jesse Plemons were cast in the film. In March 2019, Jessie Buckley, Toni Collette and David Thewlis joined the cast, with Buckley replacing Larson.

Principal photography began on March 13, 2019, in Fishkill, New York, and was completed on April 29. As of November 7, the film was in post-production.

Release
I'm Thinking of Ending Things was released in select theaters on August 28, 2020, and on Netflix on September 4.

Critical reception
On Metacritic, the film has a weighted average score of 78 out of 100 based on reviews from 46 critics, indicating "generally favorable reviews."

Karen Han of Polygon wrote: "The lack of clear answers and structure can be frustrating, but the strange way the story is told enhances just how real the exchanges between characters feel. The frustration that Lucy feels with Jake, that Jake feels with his mother, that his parents feel for each other, are all uncomfortably tangible, especially as tensions rise. The film's 134-minute runtime is a long time to sit with that feeling, but Kaufman’s big divergence from the novel he's adapting is in lending its ending a more buoyant note." In his review, Brian Tallerico of RogerEbert.com gave the film 3 out of 4 stars, calling it "a movie that is undeniably complex in terms of symbolism and a more surreal final act than most people will be expecting". He also praised the cinematography, saying that the film's atmosphere is "amplified by a tight 4:3 aspect ratio courtesy of Łukasz Żal (Cold War) that forces the viewer to pay more attention to what's in frame." The Observers Wendy Ide wrote: "This is not cinema that leaves you feeling good about things. Nor does it tread a familiar path. But I'm Thinking of Ending Things is one of the most daringly unexpected films of the year, a sinewy, unsettling psychological horror, saturated with a squirming dream logic that tips over into the domain of nightmares."

In a more mixed review, Adam Graham of The Detroit News gave the film a C, calling Plemons's and Buckley's performances excellent, but lamenting the plot, writing: "I'm Thinking of Ending Things is an unsolvable riddle where the only answer is mankind's hopelessness, and we've been down this road before." For TIME, Stephanie Zacharek wrote: "For every moment of raw, affecting insight there are zillions of milliseconds of Kaufman's proving what a tortured smartie he is. I'm Thinking of Ending Things must have been arduous to make, and it's excruciatingly tedious to watch."

Accolades

Notes

References

External links
 
 

2020 films
2020 psychological thriller films
American films with live action and animation
American independent films
American psychological thriller films
2020s English-language films
English-language Netflix original films
Films about nightmares
Films based on Canadian novels
2020 independent films
Films directed by Charlie Kaufman
Films shot in New York (state)
Films with screenplays by Charlie Kaufman
Films set in Oklahoma
Surrealist films
Magic realism films
Metaphysical fiction films
2020s American films